Frye Island is a town in Cumberland County, Maine, United States. Located in Sebago Lake, the island is accessed via a public car ferry from Raymond Neck, or by private boat. All residents of the resort town are seasonal.  The majority of property owners hail from New England area states (Maine, Massachusetts, Connecticut, Rhode Island, Vermont and New Hampshire) however there are many other states also represented on the island. Frye Island is vacant from November through April, and the ferry does not operate during that time due to thick ice blocking its route during the winter. It is part of the Portland–South Portland–Biddeford, Maine Metropolitan Statistical Area.  The town had a population of 32 at the 2020 census.

History

It was included in the 1750 grant made by the Massachusetts General Court to Captain Moses Pearson, Captain Humphrey Hobbs and their respective companies of soldiers for services during the French and Indian Wars. Pearsontown Plantation was first settled in the 1750s, then incorporated as the town of Standish on November 30, 1785. Frye Island, named for Captain Joseph Frye, seceded to become a separate town on July 1, 1998.

A popular legend on Frye Island tells of Captain Frye and his escape from a tribe of Native Americans in Portland. While being chased, Captain Frye came upon a large rock, now known as Frye's Leap, and had no way of going around it. Captain Frye made the decision to jump and swim across the channel to Frye Island. Long afterwards, Frye's Leap became a popular spot for people to recreate the famous jump. At one point, the sharp and dangerous cliffs became so popular for jumping that numerous, often serious injuries were being reported each summer. And in 2012, a man even died while attempting to dive off the rockface. This in turn caused local law enforcement and the leap's landowners to take action, and multiple No Trespassing signs were placed along the cliff edge. On hot summer days, the area is often patrolled by the Maine Warden Service, in order to ward off potential jumpers.

Many of the homes are built on waterfront property overlooking Sebago Lake. Real estate on Frye Island has skyrocketed over the past decade or so, and many of the waterfront homes assess at extremely high values. On the island, there are two marinas, various athletic and recreational facilities, several public beaches, a convenience store, an ice cream stand, a restaurant with a bar, known as the Frye's Leap Cafe, and a golf club with a lounge that is open to the public.

The island is accessed by twin  single-deck car ferries that are owned and operated by the town. They run every half-hour from early in the morning until late in the evening during July and August, reduced somewhat in off-season. The trip takes about 7 minutes. Walk-on passengers are permitted, but there is no passenger parking at the ferry landings.

Traditions
Independence Day is the most celebrated holiday on the island, signified by its well known golf cart parade and fireworks display. People from all around Sebago gather to view the fireworks, either by boat or from the beach. Each year a walk and run is held among many other festivities as well.

Geography
Frye Island is situated in Sebago Lake.

Demographics

2010 census
As of the census of 2010, there were five people, two households, and two families residing in the town. The racial makeup of the town was 100.0% White.

There were two households, of which 50.0% had children under the age of 18 living with them and 100.0% were married couples living together. Of all households 0.0% were made up of individuals. The average household size was 2.50 and the average family size was 2.50.

The median age in the town was 30.8 years. Of residents, 20% were under the age of 18; 0.0% were between the ages of 18 and 24; 40% were from 25 to 44; 0.0% were from 45 to 64; and 40% were 65 years of age or older. The gender makeup of the town was 60.0% male and 40.0% female.

References

External links
 Town of Frye Island official website
 Maine Genealogy: Frye Island, Cumberland County, Maine
 Official website for the July 4th Walk/Run
 Frye Island Maine Rentals

Islands of Cumberland County, Maine
Islands of Maine
Portland metropolitan area, Maine
Towns in Cumberland County, Maine